The 2010 Syracuse Orange football team represented Syracuse University in the 2010 NCAA Division I FBS football season. The Orange were led by head coach Doug Marrone in his second season. They played their home games at Carrier Dome and were members of the Big East Conference. For the first time since Paul Pasqualoni was fired following the 2004 season, the Orange won enough games to become bowl eligible. Syracuse played Kansas State in the Inaugural Pinstripe Bowl at Yankee Stadium where they won 36–34 to finish the season 8–5, 4–3 in Big East play.

Schedule

References

Syracuse
Syracuse Orange football seasons
Pinstripe Bowl champion seasons
Syracuse Orange football